Aerenea trigona is a species of beetle in the family Cerambycidae. It was described by Francis Polkinghorne Pascoe in 1858. It is known from Brazil and Peru.

References

Compsosomatini
Beetles described in 1858
Taxa named by Francis Polkinghorne Pascoe